The Antonio Pinto Salinas Municipality is one of the 23 municipalities (municipios) that makes up the Venezuelan state of Mérida and, according to a 2007 population estimate by the National Institute of Statistics of Venezuela, the municipality has a population of 26,073.  The town of Santa Cruz de Mora is the shire town of the Antonio Pinto Salinas Municipality.

Demographics

The Antonio Pinto Salinas Municipality, according to a 2007 population estimate by the National Institute of Statistics of Venezuela, has a population of 26,073 (up from 23,905 in 2000). This amounts to 3.1% of the state's population.

Government
The mayor of the Antonio Pinto Salinas Municipality is Jesús Alexis Rodríguez, re-elected on October 31, 2004, with 55% of the vote.  The municipality is divided into three parishes; Capital Antonio Pinto Salinas, Mesa Bolívar, and Mesa de Las Palmas.

References

Municipalities of Mérida (state)